Charles Paulet, 2nd Duke of Bolton  (1661 – 21 January 1722) was Lord Lieutenant of Ireland, Member of Parliament for Hampshire and a supporter of William III of Orange.

Life
He was the son of Charles Paulet, 1st Duke of Bolton, and Mary Scrope, daughter of Emanuel Scrope, 1st Earl of Sunderland. From 1675 (when his father succeeded as Marquess of Winchester) until April 1689 (when his father was created 1st Duke of Bolton), he was styled Earl of Wiltshire.  From 1689 until his succession to the Dukedom in 1699 he was styled Marquess of Winchester.

He was Lord Lieutenant of Hampshire and Dorset, a commissioner to arrange the union of England and Scotland, and was twice a lord justice of the kingdom. He was also lord chamberlain of the royal household and Governor of the Isle of Wight.

In Jonathan Swift's tract Remarks on the Characters of the Court of Queen Anne, a commentary on the book Memoirs of the Secret Services by John Macky, in response to Macky's statement that the Duke  "Does not now make any figure at court", Swift's dismissive reply was, "Nor anywhere else. A great booby".

Marriages and children 
Charles married three times:

First, on 10 July 1679 to Margaret Coventry (14 September 1657 – 7 February 1681 or 1682); Margaret was the daughter of George Coventry, 3rd Baron Coventry, and Margaret Tufton. No children resulted from this marriage.
Second on 8 February 1682 or 1683 to Frances Ramsden (baptised 14 June 1661 – 22 November 1696), daughter of William Ramsden and Elizabeth Palmes. They had five children:
Lady Frances Powlett (baptised 20 October 1684 Chawton, Hants – d. 1715), married John Mordaunt, Viscount Mordaunt (d. 1710) in 1708.
Charles Powlett, 3rd Duke of Bolton (3 September 1685 – 26 August 1754).
Lady Betty Charlotte (baptised 21 December 1686 at Chawton, Hampshire)
Harry Powlett, 4th Duke of Bolton (24 July 1691 – 9 October 1759). He married Catherine Parry (d. 25 April 1744). The marriage resulted in the birth of Charles Paulet, 5th Duke of Bolton, Harry Paulet, 6th Duke of Bolton and daughters Catherine Paulett and Henrietta Paulett.
Lady Mary Powlett.
Third, around 1697 to Henrietta Crofts (d. 27 February 1729 or 1730), a natural daughter of James Scott, 1st Duke of Monmouth and Eleanor Needham. They had a son:
Lord Nassau Powlett (d. 1741). He married Isabella Tufton, daughter of Thomas Tufton, 6th Earl of Thanet and Lady Catherine Cavendish.

Literature

References 

|-

1661 births
1722 deaths
Knights of the Garter
Lord-Lieutenants of Dorset
Lord-Lieutenants of Hampshire
Members of the Privy Council of England
Charles
12
People from Richmondshire (district)
People from Basingstoke and Deane
English MPs 1681
English MPs 1685–1687
English MPs 1690–1695
English MPs 1695–1698
British racehorse owners and breeders
Lords Lieutenant of Ireland